Uludere can refer to:

 Uludere, Şırnak
 Uludere, Ahlat
 Uludere Dam
 Uludere, Refahiye